Undertow is the debut studio album by American rock band Tool, released on April 6, 1993, by Zoo Entertainment. Produced by the band and Sylvia Massy, it was recorded from October to December 1992 at Sound City Studios in Van Nuys and Grandmaster Recorders in Hollywood. The album includes some tracks the band decided to not release on their debut EP Opiate. This is their only album to feature original bassist Paul D'Amour.

According to AllMusic, Undertow helped heavy metal music remain prominent as a mainstream musical style, and allowed several later bands to break through to the mainstream. It was released at a time when grunge was at the height of its popularity, and pop punk was slowly beginning to gather mainstream attention. AllMusic saw the album's success in the "striking, haunting visuals that complemented the album's nihilistic yet wistful mood."

As of 2020, Undertow has sold over three million copies in the United States, and is certified triple platinum by the Recording Industry Association of America.

Background 
Undertow was Tool's only full album release with original bassist Paul D'Amour.

Comedian Bill Hicks is noted as "inspiration" in the liner notes, and Undertow is the only Tool album released while he was still alive. Hicks's presence would feature prominently on Tool's next album, Ænima.

Chris Haskett, then with the Rollins Band, is credited in the liner notes with "sledge hammer", probably relating to the "three pianos and shotguns smashed with sledgehammers" on "Disgustipated". Adam Jones recalls a story in which the band purchased two second-hand pianos with the intention of blasting them with shotguns in the indoor parking lot of Grand Master Studio and putting the resulting sounds to tape. Apparently the woman running the studio was happy as long as they cleaned up the mess afterwards. Since the incident, Tool has been approached by other bands claiming to have seen the shotgun holes left by them in the carpark wall.

Artwork 
The album art was designed by Adam Jones. Photos in the liner notes of a nude obese woman, a nude thin man, and the band members with pins in the sides of their heads generated controversy, resulting in the album being removed from stores such as Kmart and Walmart. The band reacted by releasing another version, which depicted a giant barcode on a white background. This version of the album included a note from the band:

The message on the photographs of the band members reads "Trust me trust me trust me trust me trust me I just want to start this over say you won't go this is love I'll make weapons out of my imperfections lay back and let me show you another way only this one holy medium brings me peace of mind cleanse and purge me in the water twice as loud as reason euphoria I've been far too sympathetic no one told you to come I hope it sucks you down life feeds on life this is necessary." The songs the lyrics contained in the passage are from appear in this order: "Sober", "Crawl Away", "4°", "Prison Sex", "Flood", "Undertow", "Intolerance", "Swamp Song", "Disgustipated". The only quote missing from the album is "I'll make weapons out of my imperfections", a line from Maynard's original lyrics for "Bottom" before they were modified by guest Henry Rollins.

In some versions of the album, when the black CD tray is removed from the case, a picture of a cow licking what appears to be its genital region is revealed. In other versions of the album, released internationally, the picture of the cow licking the genital region is viewable without problems under the transparent backing of the disc case. The photo of the cow is accredited in the album's liner notes to have been taken by Danielle Bregman. The ribcage is also on the front cover of the album, but the obese woman is absent from the booklet; only the members of the band are depicted.

Adam Jones' pet pig, Moe, appears on the back cover amid an array of forks standing on end.

Reception

AllMusic gave the album a positive review, stating "With its technical brilliance, musical complexities, and aggressive overtones, Undertow not only paved the way for several bands to break through to the mainstream adolescent mall-rage demographic, it also proved that metal could be simultaneously intelligent, emotional, and brutal." In Entertainment Weeklys review of the album, David Browne said "Like many of its brethren in the alternative-metal corps—Alice in Chains, Stone Temple Pilots, and Helmet—Tool can crunch and lumber about with the best of them. What put this L.A. band a notch above the rest are better songs (with actual verses, choruses, and hooks-check out the terrific "Prison Sex") and the hints of vulnerability in singer Maynard James Keenan's voice".

In a Dotdash bibliographical article of the band, reviewer Tim Grierson called the album the "Essential Tool Album" and stated "It may be impossible to describe the impact that Undertow had at the time of its release in 1993. Searching, angry, liberating and scary, Tool's full-length debut emerged during a period in rock music when Seattle bands like Nirvana and Pearl Jam were expressing alienation through grunge riffs, inspiring lots of copycat artists. Undertow expressed alienation, too, but the album's imposing waves of misery and dread seemed to come from an entirely different planet than grunge, providing a startling counterpoint to the trendy sounds of the era". A less positive review came from Select writer Andrew Perry, who said "[B]ereft of the irony, danger and maverick punkiness of grunge's finest, Tool ultimately will only help Alice In Chains reassert the trad metal market. Which really isn't what we deserve."

Accolades 

(*) designates unordered lists.

Track listing 

"Disgustipated" is track 69 on most pressings in North America (tracks 10–68 are silent; tracks 10–67 are one second each in length, and track 68 is two seconds). It also appears as track 39, track 10 (mostly in Europe and Australia) or as a hidden track following "Flood" on track nine. On certain Japanese imports, "Disgustipated" is track 70. In all cases, however, it is listed as track 10 on the album itself.

Personnel 

The band members' instruments are listed under aliases, and Haskett is listed in the liner notes.

Tool 
 Maynard James Keenan – vocals (listed as "Möstresticator")
 Adam Jones – guitar (listed as "Bastardometer"), artwork
 Paul D'Amour – bass (listed as "Bottom Feeder")
 Danny Carey – drums (listed as "Membranophones")

Additional personnel 
 Henry Rollins  – additional vocals on "Bottom"
 Statik – programming on "Disgustipated"
 Chris Haskett  – sledgehammers on "Disgustipated"

Production 
 Produced and Mixed by Sylvia Massy
 Mixed by Ron St. Germain
 Mastering by Howie Weinberg

Charts

Sales and certifications

Release history 

 The promotional vinyl did not include the final track "Disgustipated" so that the entire album could fit onto one disc. Because it is promotional, it is possible that it was released before the regular pressing, therefore, only the year is listed.
 The year 1996 represents the year that Volcano Entertainment began using its own logo on releases which formerly used the Zoo Entertainment logo. In reality, 1996 reissues with the Volcano logo may not have actually been widely distributed until early in 1997.
 The year 1999 represents the year that Tool's Tool Dissectional label was used in conjunction with Volcano. Strong evidence supports a North American reissue date of July 1, 1999, however, the European ones are unknown. To be cautious, only the year is given for all releases of this nature.
 The year 2004 represents the year that Sony BMG was created. These reissues contain artwork that depicts Sony BMG as the distributor. Since Sony BMG's pressing schedule is not known, the actual release date may be sometime in 2004 or 2005.

References

External links 

 
 

1993 debut albums
Zoo Entertainment (record label) albums
Tool (band) albums
Obscenity controversies in music
Albums recorded at Sound City Studios